The Western Michigan Broncos are a National Collegiate Athletic Association (NCAA) Division I program representing Western Michigan University (WMU) in college athletics. They compete in the Mid-American Conference in men's baseball, basketball, football (within the Football Bowl Subdivision), soccer and tennis; and women's basketball, cross-country, golf, gymnastics, soccer, softball, track and field, and volleyball. The men's ice hockey team competes in the National Collegiate Hockey Conference. The Broncos also have a flight team, the SkyBroncos, who have won the National Intercollegiate Flying Association (NIFA) National Championship award five times.

The Broncos have won two NCAA national championships. The men's cross country team won the NCAA title in 1964 and 1965. WMU finished as national runners up in 1955 for baseball and 1958 for men's cross country.

The facilities include Waldo Stadium (football), University Arena (men's and women's basketball, volleyball), Lawson Arena (hockey), Hyames Field (baseball), Ebert Field (softball), Sorensen Courts/West Hills Athletic Club (men's and women's tennis), and Kanley Track (women's track and field). The soccer teams compete at the WMU Soccer Complex located near the Parkview Campus.

The school's primary rival is Central Michigan University.

History
WMU athletic teams were once known as the Hilltoppers, a reference to the school's location on top of Prospect Hill, but changed their nickname in 1939 to the Broncos to avoid confusion with teams of other schools such as the Western Kentucky Hilltoppers. John Gill, an assistant coach on the football team who later served as head coach, coined the new athletic nickname after approval for the name change was granted by the school's athletic board. In 2011, WMU commissioned artist Revere La Noue to create a 6,500-square-foot building wrap representing the Broncos for the 2011 ArtPrize competition. WMU president John Dunn has said that the work, "Epic Broncos", captures the "history and pride of being a Bronco".

Varsity sports
A member of the West Division of the Mid-American Conference, Western Michigan sponsors teams in 6 men's and 9 women's NCAA sanctioned sports.

Notes

Baseball

The baseball team has represented WMU since its first season in 1911, compiling an overall record of 1,822–1349–23 through 2012.  They have appeared in the College World Series six times, most recently in 1963.  In the 1955 College World Series, WMU finished as the NCAA runner-up, losing to Wake Forest 7–6 in the championship game.

WMU has won 15 Mid-American Conference championships, including 13 of 19 from 1949 to 1967 and most recently, the conference tournament in 2016.

The Broncos are coached by Billy Gernon.

Basketball

Football

Hockey

Soccer (men's)

The men's soccer team won the MAC tournament championship in 2003 and 2022.  They are coached by Chad Wiseman.  A famous former player is Rob Friend, who transferred to the University of California, Santa Barbara's Men's Soccer program.  He plays in Major League Soccer (MLS) for the LA Galaxy, as well as the Canadian National Team.

The Broncos will move men's soccer to the Missouri Valley Conference in 2023, following the MAC discontinuing sponsorship of men's soccer after the 2022 season.

Soccer (women's)
On November 9, 2013, Western Michigan women's soccer team won the Mid-American Conference tournament championship and a trip to the NCAA tournament. The MAC Championship is the second for the program, coming 10 years from the first one in 2003.

Softball
The Bronco softball team has appeared in three Women's College World Series, in 1980, 1981 and 1982 (NCAA).

Volleyball
The volleyball team has been competing at Western Michigan University since 1965.  In that span, the team has won   7 MAC regular season championships (1983, 1984, 1985, 1986, 1987, 1988, 2000) and 4 MAC tournament championships (1987, 1988, 1989, 2000).  WMU's all-time overall record is 705–482–9 (.593) and all-time conference record is 261–122 (.681).
The Broncos are coached by Colleen Munson.  In her two years at WMU, she has compiled a 41–24 (.631) record.

Other varsity sports

The men's cross country team won the NCAA Division I championship in 1964 and 1965, and finished as national runners up in 1958.

The women's gymnastics team won the MAC championship in 2006 and 2013.

The Broncos track and field sprint medley relay team is currently ranked #1 in the NCAA.

Awards
For the 2010–11 season, WMU was awarded the Cartwright Award, given to one MAC program each season for excellence in academics, athletics and citizenship. For the season, WMU won the Jacoby Trophy (most successful women's program) and finished second for the Reese Trophy (most successful men's program).

Championships

NCAA Division I National Championships
Cross Country (Men's) (2)
 1964 • 1965

NCAA Division I National Runners-up
Baseball (1)
 1955
Cross Country (Men's) (1)
 1958

MAC championships
 Baseball (15 championships)
 Regular season (14): 1989 • 1967 • 1966 • 1963 • 1962 • 1961 • 1959 • 1958 • 1957 • 1955 • 1952 • 1951 • 1950 • 1949
 Tournament (1): 2016
 Basketball (Men's) (13)
 Regular season (11): 2013–14 (West Division) • 2012–13 (West Division) • 2010–11 (West Division) • 2008–09 (West Division) • 2007–08 (West Division) • 2004–05 (West Division) • 2003–04 (West Division) • 1997–98 (West Division) • 1980–81 • 1975–76 • 1951–52
 Tournament (2): 2014 • 2004
 Basketball (Women's) (3)
 Regular season (1): 1999–2000 (West Division)
 Tournament (2): 2003 • 1985
 Cross Country (Men's) (14)
 MAC Championships: 1980 • 1979 • 1977 • 1976 • 1970 • 1968 • 1966 • 1963 • 1961 • 1960 • 1959 • 1958 • 1957 • 1948
 Cross Country (Women's) (4)
 MAC Championships: 1993 • 1986 • 1985 • 1984
 Football (5)
 Regular season: 2000 (West Division) • 1999 (West Division) • 1988 • 1966 • 2015 (Co-West Division) • 2016
 MAC Championship: 2016
 Golf (Men's) (1)
 MAC Championships: 1949
 Gymnastics (4)
 Regular season (3): 2006 • 1987 • 1986
 Tournament (1): 2006
 Soccer (Men's) (1)
 Regular season: None
 Tournament (1): 2003
 Soccer (Women's) (1)
 Regular season: None
 Tournament (2): 2003, 2015
 Softball (4)
 Regular season (3): 2006 • 1984 (Western Division) • 1983 (Western Division)
 Tournament (1): 2003
 Swimming and Diving (Men's) (2)
 Regular season: 1964 • 1963
 MAC Championships: None
 Tennis (Men's) (30)
 Regular season (22): 2015, 2009 • 2008 • 2007 • 2004 • 2000 • 1999 • 1981 • 1965 • 1964 • 1963 • 1962 • 1961 • 1960 • 1959 • 1958 • 1957 • 1956 • 1955 • 1954 • 1952 • 1950
 Tournament (8): 2016, 2010 • 2009 • 2008 • 2007 • 2006 • 2004 • 2001
 Tennis (Women's) (15)
 Regular season (11): 2008 • 2007 • 2006 • 2005 • 2001 • 2000 • 1999 • 1997 • 1995 • 1990 • 1984
 Tournament (4): 2007 • 2006 • 2000 • 1999
 Track and Field (Men's) (18)
 Regular season: 1996 • 1995 • 1985 • 1980 • 1976 • 1971 • 1970 • 1969 • 1968 • 1966 • 1965 • 1964 • 1963 • 1962 • 1961 • 1960 • 1959 • 1958
 Tournament: None
 Track and Field (Women's) (2)
 Regular season: 1987 • 1985
 Tournament: None
 Volleyball (15)
 Regular season (11): 2009 (West Division) • 2008 (West Division) • 2007 (West Division) • 2000 (West Division) • 1988 • 1987 • 1986 • 1985 • 1984 • 1983 • 1982
 Tournament (4): 2000 • 1989 • 1988 • 1987

CCHA tournament championships
 Ice Hockey (Men's) (2)
 1986, 2012

Non-varsity sports

Synchronized skating
Although the sport of synchronized skating is not an official NCAA sport Western Michigan is home to an internationally competitive synchronized skating team, who have medalled at competitions around the world. The Bronco's synchronized skating program consists of a senior team, which competes internationally as well as a collegiate level team which is competitive among the top university and collegiate teams from around the United States.
The team lost their athletic funding and Varsity status along with Men's Cross Country and Track & Field in the 2003–2004 competitive season, and became a Club sport.

Rugby
Founded in 1990, Western Michigan plays college rugby in the Mid-American Conference of Division 1AA. The Broncos reached the MAC semifinals in 2014. Recently, the men's rugby team qualified for the D1AA XV's Fall Playoff Nationals in 2017  and 2018. The Broncos play their home matches at Versluis Dickinson park in Kalamazoo, and are led by head coach Mark Allen.

Championships 

United States Collegiate Ski and Snowboard Association (USCSSA) Championships
 Snowboard Team (Combined Men's and Women's)   
2005

American Collegiate Hockey Association (ACHA) Division 2 Championships
 Ice Hockey (Men's)   
1996

National Intercollegiate Flying Association (NIFA) National Championships
 SkyBroncos Precision Flight Team (5)
1947
1948
1983
1998
2002

United States Figure Skating Association (USFSA) National Championships
 Synchronized Skating - Collegiate division 
2004

References

External links
 
 Western Michigan Broncos Hall of Fame